Thomas Moulton may refer to:

 Thomas T. Moulton (1896–1967), American sound engineer
 Thomas Moulton (knight) (died 1240), English landowner, knight, admiral and judge
 Tom Moulton (born 1940), American record producer